Gromyko or Gramyka is a Slavic surname that may refer to:

Andrei Gromyko (1909–1989), Soviet statesman
Lydia Gromyko (1911–2004), wife of Andrei Gromyko
Anatoly Gromyko (1932–2017), Soviet academician and diplomat, son of Andrei Gromyko
Julia Gromyko (born 1971), Belarusian-German waterskier

See also
Gromeko

Belarusian-language surnames